The Belgian State Railways Type 30 was a class of  steam locomotives for mixed service, introduced in 1900.

Construction history
The locomotives were built by various manufacturers from 1900 to 1901.
The machines had an inside frame with the cylinders and the Stephenson valve gear also located inside.

References

Bibliography

0-6-0 locomotives
Steam locomotives of Belgium
Standard gauge locomotives of Belgium
C n2 locomotives
Railway locomotives introduced in 1900
Cockerill locomotives
Franco-Belge locomotives
Railway Operating Division locomotives